Chandler Parsons Anderson (September 5, 1866 - August 2, 1936) was the inaugural holder of the Counselor of the United States Department of State position, serving in that capacity from August 23, 1912, to April 22, 1913. He served under President William Howard Taft and was replaced by John Bassett Moore. 

He wrote multiple books, including Northern Boundary of the United States and Immunity of Neutral Sea-Borne Commerce.

References

External links
 Chandler Anderson Photo Album of Behring Sea Claims Commission at Dartmouth College Library

1866 births
1936 deaths
United States Department of State officials
Taft administration personnel
Place of birth missing
Place of death missing